Adebayo Johnson Bankole (born October 27, 1945), is a Nigerian politician who is a commissioner in Oyo State, Nigeria. He served as a commissioner under both Governor Alao Akala and Governor Kolapo Ishola’s administration.

Early years
Bankole was born in Ile Bale Ajinapa in Orire Local Government Area of Ogbomoso on October 27, 1945 to Jacob Bankole and Abigail Bankole.

Bankole started elementary school at St Stephen Primary School in 1952. In 1954, he transferred to St David's Primary School in  Ogbomoso. 
In 1959, Bankole attended the  Anglican Secondary Modern School in Ogbomoso.  In 1961 he graduates with a Secondary Modern School Certificate.

In 1962, Bankole went to Kaduna to attend Secretarial Studies.  After graduation, he got a job as Secretary-typist at Africa Alliance Insurance company.   Bankole later became Secretary to the District Manager of Nigeria Airways. He then attended Staff Development Center, where he studied for a General Certificate of Education (GCE). He passed the GCE ordinary level in 1969 and the advanced level in 1970 and 1971.

Bankole went to New York City in September 1971 and enrolled in January 1972 at Fordham University.  He graduated in June 1974 with a Bachelor of Science Degree in Accounting. He received his Master of Business Administration (MBA) in Finance and Investment from Baruch College in February 1976.

Career
In September 1976, after finishing his education in the United States, Bankole returned to Nigeria.  He assumed a position at the Central Bank of Nigeria as Research Assistant in the Department of Research  He was later transferred to the Capital Issues Commission which later transformed to the Nigerian Securities and Exchange Commission (SEC) as financial analyst.

In January, 1978, Bankole took at job at City Securities Limited (stockbrokers), in Lagos.  He trained as Dealer on the floor of the Nigeria Stock Exchange. He moved on to M. L. Securities Limited (stockbrokers); dealt on the floor of the Nigerian Stock Exchange.

In 1985, Bankole returned to Ogbomoso in 1985 to start farming and agro-allied business at Olugbemi village near Ajinapa with factory at Aroje village, Ogbomoso. .

Political life
In 1987, Bankole was elected to the councillorship to the Oyo Local Government representing Ikoyi constituency.  This ended in 1989 when the  Orire Local Government was created on the disputed land between Ogbomoso and Oyo.

Bankole served as Oyo state Commissioner for Health and Social Welfare from 1992 to 1993. He was elected a member of National Constitutional Conference in Abuja in 1994–1995. He was appointed Chairman Governing Board of Federal Institute of Industrial Research, Oshodi from 2001 – 2004. He was appointed Oyo state Commissioner for Finance, Budget and Planning in February 2006 and reappointed to the same office in May 2007 and served till May 2011.

Bankole was awarded Fellow of the Chartered Institute of stockbrokers in 2009.

Church
Bankole is a member of the Anglican Church in Ajinapa, a community established by his uncle, Chief Oguntebo Bankole. He is an active member of the Anglican Christian Circle, Cathedral of St David, Ogbomoso.

In 2004, Bankole played a significant role in establishing the Anglican Diocese of Ogbomoso which was previously under the Ibadan Diocese.  Bankole served as a member of the Implementation Committee under the chairmanship of Justice Onalaja. Bankole was appointed the Chairman, Local Organizing Committee that raised funds throughout Nigeria for the diocese.  In May 2010, he was appointed the First Lay Deputy President of the Ogbomoso Anglican Diocese. In 2017, he was appointed as Baba Ijo of the Ogbomoso Anglican Diocese.

Bankoye is married and has several children.

References

1945 births
Living people
Nigerian politicians
People from Oyo State